The Scottish Inter-District Championship is a rugby union competition between regional sides in Scotland. Established in 1953, the tournament went through several formats.

The Scottish Rugby Union confirmed in January 2023 that the Scottish Inter-District Championship would return for the 2022-23 season, starting in May 2023. The Inter-District Championship will be an amateur championship with players selected outwith the professional United Rugby Championship and Super 6 leagues. Instead the players will be selected from the amateur leagues of Scotland; the Scottish Premiership and the national leagues below.

History

Scotland had four District Sides – the combined North and Midlands district side; South; Glasgow District and Edinburgh District. Glasgow and Edinburgh were formed in 1872 and played the world's first ever inter-district match in that year.

The district sides capped the best amateur players from their area's club sides to play inter-district matches and matches against touring sides.

Formation

The Inter-district championship was established in the 1953–54 season. The first season saw Glasgow, Edinburgh, North and South challenge for the championship. The North of Scotland District in that first season contained many Midlands players and the Midlands District complained to the Scottish Rugby Union that they should have acknowledgement for their contribution to the North squad. The SRU agreed to this and from 1954 to 1955 season onwards the combined North of Scotland and Midlands side was known as North and Midlands.

The Glasgow, Edinburgh, South and North and Midlands sides would play-off to see which district was best in Scotland. In later years a Scottish Exiles team was also invited into this championship.

Tournament format

Whether with four or five sides each team would play one another only once; either at home or away. Usually contested with only the four home-based Scottish districts, this meant that each team only played three matches. This created a situation where the tournament winners were often shared with two or three teams. It was thus a difficult tournament to win outright.

Occasionally though a deciding system was used.  In 1972–73 Glasgow and Edinburgh tied for the Championship and a separate play-off was agreed; which Edinburgh won. A knock-out system was used in 1993–94. In 1997–98, the last year before the four professional sides merged into two sides, it was agreed beforehand that – should the league places be tied – the number of tries would decide the winner. The season ended with a three-way tie between Edinburgh Rugby, Glasgow Warriors and Caledonia Reds with Edinburgh coming out on top with tries scored.

In the last Professional Inter-District Championship, the Bank of Scotland Pro Cup between Border Reivers, Edinburgh Rugby and Glasgow Warriors in 2002–03, the format was extended. Each team played their opponents twice at home and twice away. In addition, the bonus point system was used for tries and loses. The top two teams qualified for the next season's Heineken Cup and the other team was entered into the Challenge Cup.

Professionalism

The four District Sides: North and Midlands, South, Glasgow and Edinburgh were to become Caledonia Reds, Border Reivers, Glasgow Warriors and Edinburgh Rugby with professionalism.

With the advent of the professional game in Scotland, the Scottish Inter-District Championship became a European Qualifying Tournament for the professional Scottish districts to determine if they qualified for the European Champions Cup (then the Heineken Cup) or the European Challenge Cup (then the European Conference or Amlin Cup). This meant that the Scottish Exiles no longer competed in the tournament.

Merger of professional teams

In 1998, on the merger of Glasgow Rugby and Caledonia Reds to form Glasgow Caledonians – and the merger of Edinburgh Rugby with the Border Reivers to form the Edinburgh Reivers; the death knell was sounded for the Championship.

After the Tennents Tri-Series between Glasgow and Edinburgh in 1998–99, the Tri-Series survived into 1999–2000 without a sponsor. The Inter-District Championship then lingered on at amateur level once more till 2002 with the best players at amateur level once again playing for Glasgow District, Caledonia, Edinburgh District and Borders.

The professional Inter-District Championship was briefly resurrected in a new form in the 2002–03 season – with the re-establishment of the Border Reivers side – as the Bank of Scotland Pro Cup. However the Championship's return at professional level only lasted a single season as the expansion of the Celtic League the following season meant that the SRU scrapped the tournament to avoid fixture congestion with the Celtic League and European tournaments.

The Border Reivers subsequent demise in 2007 saw once again Glasgow and Edinburgh as the only remaining Scottish professional sides making any prospect of a return of the Championship – as a Tri-Series again – remote, particularly in the light of fixture congestion.

Instead the two remaining sides Glasgow Warriors and Edinburgh Rugby use their Pro14 league matches to determine the winner of the 1872 Cup, a memorial of the world's first inter-district match.

Amateur championship return

The amateur championship has returned twice in the professional era. It first returned from 1999 to 2002. The SRU announced it would return again for the season 2022-23; with the selection of amateur players to help guide selection for the Scotland Club XV international team.

Age Grades

The Inter-District Championship is still contested at age grades.

Inter-District Championship Winners

Amateur Era

The 1953–54 season's competition saw the sides Glasgow District, Edinburgh District, South of Scotland and North of Scotland play-off. Despite its name the North of Scotland district played many players from the Midlands district in its side. The combined team formally competed as North and Midlands from season 1954–55.

The Scottish Exiles, then as the Anglo-Scots, joined the Inter-District Championship from 1981 onwards.

Professional Era

In its professional guise, the Scottish Exiles were omitted from the Championship.

Amateur Championship restarted

The Amateur Inter-District has been restarted twice in the professional era. The first restart was from 1999 to 2002; the second restart from the 2022-23 season.

The amateur Inter-District Championship was briefly played again between 1999 and 2002. The North and Midlands were renamed as Caledonia; the South were renamed Scottish Borders. The Scottish Exiles did not enter in the first 1999–2000 season but entered as an amateur district in the two subsequent seasons.

The Scottish Rugby Union announced in January 2023, that the Scottish Inter-District Championship for season 2022-23 would take place in May 2023. The teams would be the traditional districts Glasgow District including the West of Scotland; Edinburgh District encompassing the Lothians; the Caledonia region encompassing the old North of Scotland and Midlands districts; and the South of Scotland district.

References

 
Rugby union competitions in Scotland
1953 establishments in Scotland